Come Along may refer to:

"Come Along", song by Elvis Presley from the album Frankie and Johnny
"Come Along", song by Maurice Williams and the Zodiacs from the album Stay with Maurice Williams & The Zodiacs
Come Along, 2001 album by Swedish singer Titiyo
"Come Along" (Titiyo song), title track from above album by Titiyo
"Come Along", a 2018 song from Cosmo Sheldrake's album The Much Much How How and I
"Come Along", a 2001 song from Gotthard's album Homerun
Come-A-Long, a mechanical pulling device

See also
"Come Along, John, an alternative title for the American song "Walk Along John", written for the blackface minstrel show stage in 1843
Come Along, 1990 song by "Salty Dog" 
Come Along Now (album), album by Greek singer Despina Vandi
"Come Along Now", 2004 title song by Phoebus featuring Despina Vandi